Alonso Manuel Lizaola de la Torre (born 3 March 1973) is a Mexican politician. As of 2006 he served as Deputy of the LX Legislature of the Mexican Congress representing Jalisco.

References

1973 births
Living people
Politicians from Jalisco
National Action Party (Mexico) politicians
21st-century Mexican politicians
Deputies of the LX Legislature of Mexico
Members of the Chamber of Deputies (Mexico) for Jalisco